Odina Desrochers (born May 25, 1951 in Joly, Quebec) is a Canadian politician.  He was a member of the Bloc Québécois in the House of Commons of Canada. He was first elected to the house in the 1997 Canadian federal election from the riding of Lotbinière. He was re-elected in the 2000 Canadian federal election in the riding of Lotbinière—L'Érable and again in the 2004 Canadian federal election from the riding of Lotbinière—Chutes-de-la-Chaudière. Desrochers served as the Bloc's critic on issues concerning Latin America and Africa, and was also the critic for Regional Development, Rural Development, Public Accounts, the Treasury Board, and Infrastructure. Desrochers was defeated in the 2006 election by Conservative farmer Jacques Gourde.

Before his election to the House of Commons, he worked as a journalist.
Canadian federal election, 2000/Lotbinière—L'Érable: Revision history

External links
How'd They Vote?: Voting history and quotes
 

1951 births
Living people
Members of the House of Commons of Canada from Quebec
Bloc Québécois MPs
21st-century Canadian politicians